Mesosa sparsenotata is a species of beetle in the family Cerambycidae. It was described by Maurice Pic in 1922. It is known from Vietnam.

References

sparsenotata
Beetles described in 1922